African Junior Swimming Championships are the African championships in the sport of Swimming. It is organised by the African Swimming Confederation (CANA) and held biennially. The competitor age In 2019 was two categories the competitor age is for both sexes 13 to 14 and 15 to 16 years. From 2021 the competitor age is for females 14 to 17 years and for males 15 to 18 years.

The most recent edition of the Championships was held in September 2019 in Tunis, Tunisia.

Championships

Championships records

See also
 African Swimming Championships
 African Masters Aquatics Championships
 Swimming at the African Games

References

External links 
African Swimming Confederation

International swimming competitions
Recurring sporting events established in 1988